Robert E.M. Nourse is an entrepreneur and former President and CEO of The Bombay Company.

Nourse holds an MBA from the Richard Ivey School of Business (1964) and a DBA from Harvard Business School. After nine years as a professor at Ivey and after holding the position of Chairman of the MBA program, in 1976 he left academia to become a venture capitalist and an executive with Venturetek International Ltd.

Bob Nourse purchased The Bombay Company of Canada, which was a single store at the time, in 1979. The Bombay Company grew to 450 stores with net sales of US$317 million for 1994.  Nourse guided The Bombay Company to its successful listing on the New York Stock Exchange in 1993. Later that year, Inc. Magazine voted him Entrepreneur of the Year, calling the firm "America's hottest company."  

After a decline in sales, Nourse was fired as CEO of Bombay on September 5, 1996, with Chairman Carson Thompson attributing the change to "a culmination of a lack of performance over a period of time."

Awards 
1993 Inc. Magazine voted him the Entrepreneur of the Year
1994 Ivey Business Leader of the Year

External links
Introduction and list of judges and winners for Inc.'s 1993 Entrepreneur of Year Award

References

Year of birth missing (living people)
Living people
University of Western Ontario alumni
Canadian venture capitalists
Harvard Business School alumni
Academic staff of the University of Western Ontario
Place of birth missing (living people)